Liolaemus curicensis, the Curicen tree iguana, is a species of lizard in the family  Liolaemidae. It is native to Chile.

References

curicensi
Reptiles described in 1938
Reptiles of Chile
Taxa named by Lorenz Müller
Taxa named by Walter Hellmich
Endemic fauna of Chile